Age of Reptiles is a series of comics written by Ricardo Delgado published by Dark Horse Comics.

The series originally consisted of two comics, which are set in the Mesozoic era: Tribal Warfare, from 1993, and The Hunt, from 1997. Both are very violent stories about the daily lives of carnivorous dinosaurs. A third series, The Journey, began November 2009, with a fourth, "Ancient Egyptians", debuting June 2015.  Tribal Warfare, The Hunt, and The Journey have been collected in Age of Reptiles Omnibus, Volume 1.

The Hunt received an Eisner award for Talent Deserving of Wider Recognition in 1997.

Tribal Warfare 
A pack of Deinonychus get revenge on Blue Back, a Tyrannosaurus who stole their well-earned meal, by stealing all of his family's eggs but one.

A group of four Deinonychus successfully stalk and kill a small sauropod out on the savannah. However, they are soon chased off their kill by the Tyrannosaur Blue Back, who kills one of the Deinonychus in the process. The pack retreats back to their lair and family group, as does Blue Back. One of Blue Back's young tries to hunt an early mammal but is unable to catch it.

That night the nest is raided by a pair of Deinonychus, who successfully carry off (and presumably eat) or break the eggs. Blue Back pursues them, but they manage to escape by leaping across a gorge. The chapter ends with Blue Back roaring his grief to the sky.

The second chapter begins with another Tyrannosaur hunting down and killing a hadrosaur. It then cuts to the trio of Deinonychus going out on another hunting patrol. At the side of a river one of the Deinonychus spots a primitive fish (similar to a mudskipper) wriggling its way along the bank to try and get back into the water. The hungry predator prepares to make a meal out of the fish, only to be ambushed and devoured itself by a massive crocodile that had been lurking nearby. The remaining two Deinonychus continue on, avoiding a hunting Tyrannosaur in the process. The Tyrannosaur prepares to attack a herd of Triceratops, but loses the element of surprise and in face of a prepared enemy withdraws.

The two Deinonychus return to their lair only to find that Blue Back has tracked them back to it and slaughtered four of their number; he escapes the same way they had, by leaping across a gorge, and leaves the Deinonychus in the same position he had been.

Chapter Three sees a group of Deinonychus attack an Ankylosaur; however, the herbivore drives them off by bashing one of their number with its tail club. The Tyrannosaurs, seeing that there is only one intact egg left, become determined not to fall victim to egg thieves again. The three Deinonychus, meanwhile, stumble upon a nest full of turtle eggs high in the cliffs above a sea and feast upon them. As they try to leave, they are ambushed by the Tyrannosaurs; one of the Deinonychus is knocked over the cliff into the sea, where it is devoured by a large ichthyosaur. The other two are likewise knocked over the cliff as well, but onto dry land; one of them is killed in the fall, but the other one survives.

The Tyrannosaurs begin to teach the juvenile how to hunt, stalking a kentrosaurus, but Deinonychus lures the juvenile away from the safety of its parent and into an ambush, where it is attacked by a large pack of Deinonychus. The adult tyrannosaur, realizing the danger too late, tries to track the juvenile down, only to find it dead, the leg of a dead Deinonychus still clamped firmly in its jaws.

Chapter Four sees a pack of Deinonychus stalking an old and dying sauropod; when it collapses, and dies, they move into to try and begin feasting, only to be confronted by a large group of other predators, including a Carnotaurus and an Oviraptor. The Deinonychus pack is split, as one of the raptors wants to fight the other group while the other insists on retreat. This leads to a battle for leadership. The surviving raptors return to their lair in the middle of a rainstorm, only to find the Tyrannosaurs waiting; the larger predators attack, and a massive battle ensues. The fighting causes the cliffside the raptor's lair is perched on to collapse, sending all of the animals plunging into the gorge. A single Tyrannosaur manages to survive the fall and returns to its own lair, only to find that the early mammal the juvenile Tyrannosaur had tried to hunt earlier had eaten the last remaining egg....with the story ending there.

The story can best be described as a sort of "gang war" between the two species, and while many of the animals depicted in Delgado's story did not exist at the same time period or place, their inclusion was added for familiarity and dramatic effect.

The Hunt 
After a mother Allosaurus is killed by a pack of Ceratosaurus, they begin to chase her son. Eventually, the son grows up and takes his revenge.

The story begins with a young Allosaurus catching a lizard. The Allosaurus and his mother have a den located underneath an overhanging rock outcropping. However, they are soon attacked by a pack of Ceratosaurus; the young Allosaurus flees as its mother takes on, but is ultimately overwhelmed and killed by, the rival carnivores. Months go by, and the young Allosaurus is older, now a juvenile, but is still being hunted by the Ceratosaurus pack. The Allosaurus is chased all the way back to the scene of its mother's death, where he lures the Ceratosaurus pack under the outcropping. The outcropping collapses, seeming to bury all five of the pursuing predators under the rubble. However, they turn out only to be delayed by the rockslide.

The pack of Ceratosaurus goes looking for food come across the remains of a dead sauropod. As they begin to feed the young Allosaurus, which had eaten his way inside the carcass and taken shelter there, flees the scene. Exhausted after fleeing, the Allosaurus lays down to rest near a grouping of boulders and rocks, seemingly on the verge of death. A group of Compsognathus, looking for a free meal, approach; one of them goes so far as to bite the Allosaurus’ tongue. This does not go well for the small scavenger, as the Allosaurus promptly devours it, as well as a second Compsognathus, before heading up into the rocks to find a better place to rest. The Allosaurus awakes to find himself surrounded by the Ceratosaurus pack, which had tracked it down; however, an earthquake causes the entire rock formation to collapse. The Allosaurus recovers from the fall first, and tries to escape the cavern he fell into; however, he soon discovers the exit is the edge of another cliff. The Ceratosaurus pack, however, has caught up and promptly attacks again, knocking all of them over the edge and into a river leading to a waterfall.

Chapter Two sees the Allosaurus washed over the edge of the waterfall into a large lake and lush green forest far different from the arid, desert landscape it had come from. Noticing a large number of herbivores, the Allosaurus emerges from the water and decides to rest and recover before trying to score a kill. However, the Ceratosaurus pack has also been washed over the waterfall and survived their ordeal.

Meanwhile, the local pterosaurs squabble over the corpse of a dead Iguanodon and interact with other creatures; their power of flight means they can go from the desert to the lake and back with a great deal of ease.

The Ceratosaurus pack stalks and attacks a Stegosaurus; after a tough fight they manage to kill the herbivore, and the chapter ends with something watching them from the bushes.

Chapter Three sees the Allosaurus watching a herd of sauropods; however, a sudden rainstorm causes him to decide to retreat to his new lair, a small cave. The main storyline of this chapter occurs in the skies overhead. After a long chase, a green pterosaur is attacked and killed by a group of three black pterosaurs; it seems the two groups are rivals for prey or territory. A lightning strike causes a fire in the cliff face den of the green pterosaurs; one of them, in a panic, winds up falling off the cliff to its death.

Chapter Four begins with a massive tidal wave caused by heavy rain sweeping over the waterfall and swamping the lake; the black pterosaurs den is destroyed by this wave, with only one of them managing to escape before the wave hits. Down in the forest the Allosaurus and a small group of sauropods he was stalking try to escape the flood but are swept away. The sauropods the Allosaurus was hunting survive the waters, but dozens more drown; the Ceratosaurus pack gorges itself on the carcasses. The pack separates, and the Allosaurus sees his opportunity. Diving underwater, it manages to use the corpses of the sauropods as cover to ambush, kill and devour one of the Ceratosaurs.

Chapter Five begins with two of the sauropods which survived the flood making their way along the beach, passing several dead marine reptiles being fed on by pterosaurs as they do. Suddenly, they are attacked by three Ceratosaurs....but the Allosaurus is watching from the shadows. To the shock of the smaller carnivores, he suddenly intervenes, attacking the pack members. A fierce battle ensues, with one of the Ceratosaurs recognizing the Allosaurus they are fighting as the young Allosaurus which escaped them so long ago.

The Allosaurus manages to kill one of the Ceratosaurs pack by disemboweling it, and the fight turns into a game of cat and mouse. A second Ceratosaurus rushes at the Allosaurus, which manages to use his tail to knock it down and then rips out its throat. The third Ceratosaurus withdraws from the fight, causing the Allosaurus to give chase. Venturing into another cave system, the Allosaurs briefly confronts a group of Plesiosaurs in the cave's underground river before he is ambushed by another Ceratosaurus. After a short fight, the Allosaurus dispatches his attacker and hurls the corpse into the water for the Plesiosaurs to feast on.

Pressing onwards, the Allosaurus discovers the final Ceratosaurus...and a nest full of baby Ceratosaurs. Rather than repeat the same actions that defined his own life, the Allosaurus decides to leave them alone and departs. The comic ends with the Allosaurus trudging off into the night.

The second book is more of a tale of revenge, but features a similar "species vs. species" rivalry. In real life Ceratosaurus largely avoided competition with Allosaurus by living different habitats and having a different diet, though the two did coexist in some regions. It is noticeably less violent than the first book, featuring a comparatively small amount of gore.

The Journey 
The Journey was published in 2009–10. It tells the sprawling migration of a herd of dinosaurs.

The story begins with a sweeping depiction of the North American Cretaceous forest. A massive herd composed of a large number of different species—sauropods, ankylosaurs, hadrosaurs, ceratopsians, ornithomimids and more—are preparing to embark on the annual migration journey. Their trail is stalked by predators, with an early example being a trio of raptors who descend upon the corpse of an old, sick hadrosaur which was unable to embark on the journey. As they head into a forest, a baby Triceratops spies a piece of fruit. Its parent calls out a warning, almost too late, as a tyrannosaur burst from the woods and attacks it. The baby races back towards the heard, narrowly avoiding the jaws of the tyrannosaur, as the parent rushes to the rescue, crashing into the carnivore. The baby makes it to the safety of the herd, which closes ranks in the face of the marauding predator. Rather than trying to find a gap in the herd, or risk an attack on a healthy adult Triceratops, the tyrannosaur decides to withdraw and wait for a better opportunity.

The baby Triceratops happily greets its parent, which gives the dinosaur equivalent of scolding it for wandering off and putting itself in so much danger, and the herd continues on its way. Meanwhile, hidden behind the tree line, the tyrannosaur stalks the herd, waiting for its chance. As it turns out, the tyrannosaur has two offspring of its own it needs to feed, and the three of them settle in to watch the herd go by.

The herd continues onwards, reaching a dry, dusty plain and squabbling amongst themselves. The tyrannosaur, still following them, catches a mouse to feed to its young off in the distance.

Chapter Two sees the herd enter a large canyon, only to find the oasis there almost completely dried up, with the only animals nearby being a large group of crocodiles. The crocodiles are starving and in no mood to share their water, and launch attacks on dinosaurs which try to come and drink. After several failed attempts they managed to bring down a sauropod.

Meanwhile, the path has turned into a steep decline out of the canyon, and several herd members lose their footing and tumble to their deaths on the rocks below. The tyrannosaur and its young happily scavenge the carcasses. Meanwhile, an immense pack of raptors swarms down from the cliffs above to attack the herd. The raptors work like piranhas, swarming their prey and ripping them apart. They manage to bring down a sauropod, several hadrosaurs and triceratops, a number of smaller herbivores, and an ankylosaur, as the panicked herd flees, knowing their only chance is to get out of the area as soon as possible. While some raptors are killed in their attacks, there are well over a hundred of them on the attack, and they do not even notice the losses. The herd moves on as the raptors gorge themselves.

The tyrannosaur and its young manage to scavenge part of the raptors’ kill that night; the raptors are simply too well fed to put up a fight as long as the tyrannosaur promptly leaves, which it does.

Chapter Three sees the herd enter a dense forest; a number of baby Triceratops and Ankylosaurs disorientate and sicken themselves by eating mushrooms, causing another minor confrontation between the parents of the young animals. The tyrannosaur ambushes and kills a hadrosaur which wandered off from the main herd. The herd then prepares to cross a river teeming with crocodiles, which, similarly to the raptors, swarm their targets, killing a number of the crossing herbivores. Having crossed the river, the herd continues onwards; the tyrannosaur manages to ward off the crocodiles and crosses with its young in tow as well.

Chapter Four sees a second wave of predators close in, as mosasaurs and plesiosaurs follow the herd as it makes its way along a beach near the ocean. A baby sauropod which had been trapped in the river onto the corpse of a hadrosaur is washed along towards the beach by the tide; as a group of mosasaurs attacks the corpse, it is forced to make a break for the shore. One mosasaur spots it and tries to move in for the kill; by sheer luck, the baby sauropod makes it onto land just as the two baby tyrannosaurs are passing nearby. The mosasaur lunges out of the surf, but the parent tyrannosaur comes rushing to the rescue, fearing for the safety of its young; a massive battle ensues. After a tough fight, both predators ultimately decide to withdraw, with the mosasaur slinking back to the deep and the tyrannosaurs sharing a moment.

Finally, the herd enters another canyon and reaches its destination, a forest with a long and winding river. The various herbivores which survived the perilous journey begin feeding and settling into their new homes, while off in the distance the tyrannosaur and its young do the same. The comic ends with the sun setting over the valley.

The Body 
"The Body," an eight-page short story, was published in Dark Horse Presents #4 in Sept. 2011. It concerns what happens to a dinosaur's body after it dies.
Animals in the comic:
 Tenontosaurus
 Pterosaur
 Deinonychus
 Acrocanthosaurus

The story begins with a pack of three Acrocanthosaurus hunting down and killing a Tenontosaurus. The large carnivores feast heavily on the carcass, briefly getting in a dispute, before moving off to find more prey. The carcass is then scavenged by a pack of Deinonychus, who engage in a fight with a group of pterosaurs over the remains. The Deinonychus ultimately withdraw and allow the pterosaurs to eat their fill. The carcass, now pretty much picked clean, lies out in the open before finally being buried by the elements to wait to be excavated millions of years later.

Baby Turtles 
"Baby Turtles," an eight-page short story, was published in Dark Horse Presents #3 in Oct. 2014. It features the journey of baby turtles to the seas of Cretaceous North America.

The story begins with a large group of Archelon turtles hatching in a nesting ground and beginning a trek towards the sea. An overhead shot shows that there are hundreds of these small turtles....which unfortunately attracts huge numbers of predators. Pterosaurs, mosasaurs, plesiosaurs, sharks, Xiphactinus fish and all sorts of other predators lie in wait, attacking the column of baby Archelon as they make their way down the coastline and into the water. While many fall prey to the dangers lying in wait for them, sheer numbers means that many more successfully make it past the dangers.

The story ends with a long line of baby Archelon, having successfully run the gauntlet of predators, making their way out into the open ocean.

Ancient Egyptians 
Ancient Egyptians is set in prehistoric Africa. It features Spinosaurus as the protagonist, and the first installment came out on June 3, 2015. It was concluded in September 2015.

The story begins with a depiction of a small river and oasis in the scorching North African heat of the Cretaceous period. A Spinosaurus with numerous scars along its facial features makes into way into the oasis’ forest, briefly encountering a pair of Deltadromeus which beat a hasty retreat in the face of the hulking predator. The Spinosaurus is not interested in them though; its destination is the local river. Plunging under water, with nothing but the sail on its back showing, the Spinosaurus makes its way through the swamp, passing turtles, crocodiles and pterosaurs as it does so. Briefly emerging from the water, Spinosaurus attacks and devours a small crocodile before continuing ever deeper into the swamp. Resting at the river's edge, the Spinosaurus is startled when a panicked Carcharodontosaurus plunged into the river, pursued by an enraged herd of Paralititans; the sauropods quickly trample the hapless carnivore to death, while two other Carcharodontosaurus beat a hasty retreat.

The sauropods move into the river and very nearly step on Spinosaurus, which erupts from the water and faces off with the herd. The herd leader tries to kick at Spinosaurus, only for the sail-backed dinosaur to slash the sauropod's foot with its claws, injuring it. The herbivores are disgruntled by their leader's injury, but they know Spinosaurus is not interested in them and withdraw from the river, leaving it alone.

After settling back in to rest for a while, Spinosaurus emerges from the water once more, heading towards a small clearing amongst the trees where it settles down with another Spinosaurus. That night, a pack of Rugops scavenge the carcass of the dead Carcharodontosaurus; after briefly poking its head up to investigate, Spinosaurus goes back to sleep.

The next morning, Spinosaurus awakes at dawn to find crocodiles have continued feasting on the dead Carcharodontosaurus; with a yawn, it slips into the river once more. Spinosaurus catches a ray for breakfast and continues on its way as a number of smaller aquatic animals— everything from small plesiosaurs to sharks and sawfish—go about their business in its shadow. Spinosaurus then catches a large fish, fighting off an attack by a crocodile in the process.

After another brief encounter with the Paralitian herd, Spinosaurus makes its way into another part of the swamp.

The second chapter starts with the Paralitian herd browsing on vegetation, unaware they are being stalked by a small pack of Carcharodontosaurus. The predators are eyeing the Paralitian babies playing on the edge of the herd. The predators move closer and closer and finally strike. Their hit and run attack is a massive success—they race in, snap up the young Paralitian, and flee— and there is nothing the sauropods can do about it.

Spinosaurus, meanwhile, pokes his head up out of the water in time to see the pack race on by— but he is soon distracted by the sight of another Spinosaurus. Offering her a fish he caught as a gift, the two Spinosaurs mate.

The Carcharodontosaurus pack, meanwhile, gorges itself on young Paralitian, chasing off pterosaurs who try and scavenge a meal. One of the young Paralitians is left alive to allow a baby Carcharodontosaurus to practice hunting skills; its first attack is unsuccessful, but ultimately it manages to score its first kill.

Spinosaurus returns with the female Spinosaurus only to find she already has offspring from a previous mate. In a scene typical of many male predatory animals, Spinosaurus wipes most of them out— although at least one escapes— in order to ensure that it is his offspring that are cared for and have a better chance to survive.

Chapter Three begins with one of the Carcharodontosaurus pack bringing the remains of a dead baby Paralitian back to the clearing, only to find the rest of the pack gone; it finds out why soon enough, as the sauropod herd rumbles out of the trees, surrounds the carnivore, and brutally stomps it to death.

Spinosaurus scavenges the meal to bring back to the female Spinosaurus, but she has not forgiven him for his rampage. Meanwhile, the Rugops pack approaches the herd of Paralitian as night falls; chased off by the herd leader, they swim across the river and stumble upon the Carcharodontosaurus pack feasting on crocodiles. The baby Carcharodontosaurus moves off away from the pack and the Rugops, seeing an easy kill, begin to stalk it. Soon enough they corner the baby Carcharodontosaurus; luckily for it, the adults come rushing to the rescue and chase off the Rugops pack. The Rugops head deeper into the forest, stumbling across an area where a lightning strike killed one of their number; linking up with another group of Rugops, they soon find a new place to sleep.

A large group of the ever-present small scavenging reptiles attack Spinosaurus at him and the female Spinosaurus's nest; Spinosaurus fights them off, impressing the female Spinosaurus and winning back her trust. The chapter ends with the Paralitian herd passing by Spinosaurus’ nest and the herd leader and Spinosaurus staring each other down.

Chapter Four begins with Spinosaurus cruising through the swamp, catching a ray in the process. However, as he emerges from the water he is confronted by the Paralitian herd....a confrontation which the Carcharodontosaurus pack watches eagerly. The Paralitian herd leader tries to stomp Spinosaurus, but he is able to outmaneuver it and raked its belly deeply with his claws. The wound causes the herd leader to collapse in agony, much to the shock and delight of the Carcharodontosaurus pack. Already licking their chops in anticipation, they waste no time in launching their own attack on the herd leader. As
several Rugops and Deltadromeus also join the attack as Spinosaurus attempts to remove himself from the confrontation. The herd leader manages to stagger on, even with more than a dozen predators ripping into it, before collapsing and going down for the last time. The various predators and scavengers begin happily feasting on the corpse.

Spinosaurus returns to his nest, where it is revealed the female Spinosaurus has laid a clutch of eggs. Knowing that he would be a threat if he remains, after sharing one last goodbye look with the female Spinosaurus, he trudges off, back out of the oasis and once more into the desert. A brief scene reveals that the baby Spinosaurus which was fast enough to escape his rampage is still alive, and it watches him as he keeps moving away. The comic ends with Spinosaurus steadily moving away from the oasis and, quite literally, walking off into the sunset.

Animals in the comic:
 Deltadromeus
 Araripesuchus
 Carcharodontosaurus
 Spinosaurus
 Paralititan
 Rugops
 Mawsonia
 Stomatosuchus

See also
 Gon, a similar pantomime comic about dinosaurs.

References

Age of Reptiles TPB
Age of Reptiles The Hunt
Age of Reptiles Omnibus

Dark Horse Comics titles
Dinosaurs in comic books
Pantomime comics
Comics set in prehistory
1993 comics debuts
Slice of life comics